Badlands (sometimes Badlands San Francisco, Badlands SF, or San Francisco Badlands) was a gay bar and nightclub in San Francisco's Castro District, in the U.S. state of California.  According to the San Francisco Chronicle, "Most nights attract a healthy crowd to the dance floor, where Britney, Gaga and Madonna rule the playlists."

The bar opened in 1975 and closed in July 2020.

History
In April 2005, the San Francisco Human Rights Commission said the bar discriminated against African American customers and job seekers. The bar was included in Business Insider 2013 list of "The 10 Best Gay Bars in San Francisco".

See also
 Impact of the COVID-19 pandemic on the LGBT community

References

External links

 

1975 establishments in California
2020 disestablishments in California
Castro District, San Francisco
Defunct LGBT nightclubs in California
Impact of the COVID-19 pandemic on the LGBT community